Ascomycin, also called Immunomycin, FR-900520, FK520, is an ethyl analog of tacrolimus (FK506) with strong immunosuppressant properties. It has been researched for the treatment of autoimmune diseases and skin diseases, and to prevent rejection after an organ transplant.

Ascomycin acts by binding to immunophilins, especially macrophilin-12. It appears that Ascomycin inhibits the production of Th1 (interferon- and IL-2) and Th2 (IL-4 and IL-10) cytokines. Additionally, ascomycin preferentially inhibits the activation of mast cells, an important cellular component of the atopic response. Ascomycin produces a more selective immunomodulatory effect in that it inhibits the elicitation phase of allergic contact dermatitis but does not impair the primary immune response when administered systemically.

Ascomycin is produced by the fermentation of certain strains of Streptomyces hygroscopicus.

In fiction 
Ascomycin is also the name of a fictional "antiagathic" (anti-aging) drug in James Blish's future history Cities in Flight. and also They shall have stars.

Related compounds 
Tacrolimus, Pimecrolimus

References

Further reading

External links 
Exciting New Eczema Treatment Expected This Year By Jane Schwanke, WebMD Medical News March 17, 2000 (San Francisco)

Immunosuppressants